Murder Off the Record is a 1957 thriller novel by the British writer John Bingham. It is also known by the alternative title Marilyn.

Adaptation
In 1962 the novel was adapted for an episode of the television series Alfred Hitchcock Presents entitled Captive Audience, starring James Mason and Angie Dickinson.

References

Bibliography
 Reilly, John M. Twentieth Century Crime & Mystery Writers. Springer, 2015.

1957 British novels
British thriller novels
Novels by John Bingham
British novels adapted into television shows
Victor Gollancz Ltd books